The 2006 Ugandan Super League was the 39th season of the official Ugandan football championship, the top-level football league of Uganda.

Overview
The 2006 Uganda Super League was contested by 15 teams and was won by Uganda Revenue Authority SC, while Kampala United, KB Lions and Super Cubs were relegated.

League standings

Leading goalscorer
The top goalscorer in the 2006 season was Dan Walusimbi of Police FC with 15 goals.

Footnotes

External links
 Uganda - List of Champions - RSSSF (Hans Schöggl)
 Ugandan Football League Tables - League321.com

Ugandan Super League seasons
1
Uganda
Uganda